Oliver Emery Robichaud (born February 3, 1943) was a Canadian politician. He served in the Legislative Assembly of New Brunswick from 1982 to 1987, as a Progressive Conservative member for the constituency of Caraquet.

References

Progressive Conservative Party of New Brunswick MLAs
1943 births
Living people